Alfredo Manuel da Silva Murça (17 January 1948 – 24 August 2007) was a Portuguese international footballer who played as a defender.

Football career 
Murça earned 5 caps for the Portugal national football team. He made his international debut on 10 December 1969 in London, in a 1–0 defeat against England.

Personal
His was the older brother of Joaquim Murça.

External links 
 
 

1948 births
Sportspeople from Almada
2007 deaths
Portuguese footballers
Portugal international footballers
Association football defenders
C.F. Os Belenenses players
FC Porto players
Vitória S.C. players
Primeira Liga players